Calvin Douglas Jones (September 26, 1963 – February 12, 2022) was an American professional baseball pitcher. He played during two seasons in Major League Baseball (MLB) for the Seattle Mariners.

Career
Jones attended the University of California, Riverside, where he played college baseball for the Highlanders from 1982–1983.

He was drafted by the Mariners as the 1st pick in the 1st round of the January 1984 MLB draft. Jones played his first professional season with their Class A (Short Season) Bellingham Mariners in 1984, and his last season with the Los Angeles Dodgers' Triple-A Albuquerque Dukes in 1996.

Personal life and death
Jones died from cancer on February 12, 2022, at the age of 58.

References

External links

Mexican League
The Baseball Gauge
Venezuela Winter League

1963 births
2022 deaths
African-American baseball players
Albuquerque Dukes players
American expatriate baseball players in Canada
American expatriate baseball players in Mexico
Baseball players from California
Bellingham Mariners players
Calgary Cannons players
Camden Riversharks players
Canton-Akron Indians players
Chaffey College alumni
Chaffey Panthers baseball players
Charlotte Knights players
Chattanooga Lookouts players
Leones del Caracas players
American expatriate baseball players in Venezuela
Major League Baseball pitchers
Mexican League baseball pitchers
Nashville Sounds players
Newark Bears players
Olmecas de Tabasco players
Pawtucket Red Sox players
Salinas Spurs players
San Bernardino Spirit players
Seattle Mariners players
Sportspeople from Compton, California
Taichung Agan players
UC Riverside Highlanders baseball players
Vermont Mariners players
Wausau Timbers players
Williamsport Bills players
21st-century African-American people
20th-century African-American sportspeople
Deaths from cancer in Texas
Verbum Dei High School alumni
American expatriate baseball players in Taiwan